Microbacterium chocolatum is a bacterium from the genus Microbacterium.

References

Further reading

External links
Type strain of Microbacterium chocolatum at BacDive -  the Bacterial Diversity Metadatabase	

Bacteria described in 1998
chocolatum